Sir Jack Wolfred Ashford Harris, 2nd Baronet (23 July 1906 – 26 August 2009) was a New Zealand businessman, and the second baronet of the Harris Baronetcy of Bethnal Green, County of London which was created for his father Sir Percy Harris (1876–1952) in 1932. Frieda Harris was his mother. He succeeded to the title in 1952.

Harris was born in London, and educated at Shrewsbury School and Trinity Hall, Cambridge where he received a BA. He came to New Zealand in 1926.

Harris was chief executive (1936–1970) of Bing, Harris and Co., a New Zealand general importing and exporting company established in 1858 by his grandfather, Wolf Harris (1858–1926). He later lived in Waikanae near Wellington. He died aged 103 on 26 August 2009 at a rest home in the suburb of Whitby in Porirua. Upon his death, he was succeeded as baronet by his son, Christopher John Ashford Harris, as 3rd Baronet.

References
 
Memoirs of a Century by Sir Jack Harris (2007, Steele Roberts) 
Obituary in Dominion Post of 5 September 2009 page B6
Burke’s Peerage, Baronetage and Knightage, page 1077-8 (1959, 102nd edition)
Who’s Who in New Zealand (1991, 12th edition)
 Photo from Dominion Post on his 103rd birthday

1906 births
2009 deaths
Baronets in the Baronetage of the United Kingdom
English emigrants to New Zealand
New Zealand centenarians
Men centenarians
Alumni of Trinity Hall, Cambridge
20th-century New Zealand businesspeople
People educated at Shrewsbury School
People from Waikanae